Asano Nagayuki (June 27, 1864 – April 23, 1947) was the 28th family head of the Asano clan, which ruled over Hiroshima Domain before 1871.

He was cousin of the last feudal lord (daimyō) of Hiroshima Domain Asano Nagakoto, and succeeded him as head of the Asano family upon his death in 1937.

Family
 Father: Asano Nagaatsu (1843–1873)
 Adoptive Father: Asano Nagakoto
 Wives:
 Matsudaira Akiko, daughter of Matsudaira Sadayasu of Matsue Domain
 Ōkōchi Kyoko, daughter of Ōkōchi Teruna of Takasaki Domain
 Children:
 Asano Nagatake
 Ōkōchi Terunobu by Kyoko
 Asano Teruatsu

See also 
 Kazoku

References 

Members of the House of Peers (Japan)
1864 births
1947 deaths
Asano clan